My Book may refer to:

 My Book (album), a 2006 album by K-Ci
 Western Digital My Book, a brand of external hard drive